Mar Jose Porunnedom (born 13 March 1956) is a Syro-Malabar Catholic bishop who currently serves as the bishop of Manathavady Diocese. He is the third bishop of Manathavady Diocese.

Early life and episcopal career 
Jose Porunnedom was born at Vettimattom of Idukki district on 13 March 1956. After completing his studies at St. Joseph's Minor Seminary, Tellicherry, St. Joseph's Pontifical Seminary, Aluva and at the Pontifical Urban University, Rome he was ordained a priest on 22 December 1982. In 1986, he went to Rome and obtained a Doctorate in Canon Law from Pontifical Oriental Institute. On 18 March 2004, Pope John Paul II named him as the Bishop of Mananthavady as a successor of Bishop Emmanuel Giles Pothanamuzhi. He was consecrated on 15 May 2004, and took charge of the diocese.

References

External links 
Official Website of Mananthavady Diocese

1956 births
Syro-Malabar bishops
Pontifical Urban University alumni
Christian clergy from Kerala
Pontifical Oriental Institute alumni
Living people
People from Idukki district